Ernest Merrick OAM (born 15 January 1953) is a Scottish-Australian coach, who last managed A-League soccer club Newcastle Jets. He was released on 6 January 2020. He was the former head coach of the Hong Kong national football team and A-League clubs Melbourne Victory and Wellington Phoenix. He currently serves as the chief football officer for Football Australia.

Coaching career

Melbourne Victory
In his first season at Melbourne Victory in 2005/06, the club failed to live up to its championship aspirations. With Socceroos Archie Thompson and Kevin Muscat in the squad, and the experience of 2 European internationals in Geoffrey Claeys and Richard Kitzbichler, expectations from the Melbourne fans were high. But they were left disappointed when the club finished the season 7th out of the 8 teams. After a promising start which saw them 1st after round 8, when they beat eventual champions Sydney FC 5–0, the team then won only 3 of the last 13 games.

During the second season, The Victory won the 2006–07 A-League Premiership, 12 points clear of second placed Adelaide United. Melbourne Victory faced Adelaide United in the A-League Grand Final at the Telstra Dome on 18 February, winning the match 6–0 with Archie Thompson scoring an incredible five goals.

The 2007–2008 season was a return to the disappointment of Merrick's first year in charge however, with the team finishing outside the Top 4 spots and thus failing to progress to the Finals Series.

Melbourne Victory finished second in the group phase of the 2008 Asian Champions League. Gamba Osaka won the group and went on to win the Asian Champions League.

In the 2008–2009 season, Melbourne Victory won the treble; the Pre-Season Cup, the Premiership and the Grand Final. In the Grand Final, Melbourne Victory defeated Adelaide United 1–0 to secure their second championship under Ernie Merrick's coaching.

During the 2009–2010 season, Melbourne Victory, despite severe season-ending knee injuries to key players, Billy Celeski, Matthew Kemp and star striker Archie Thompson once again reached the Grand Final. Sydney FC took out the title after extra time on penalties. Kevin Muscat and Marvin Angulo missed their penalty kicks, allowing Sydney to take out the championship.

On 12 March 2011, Ernie Merrick was sacked from his post at Melbourne Victory. The board of Melbourne Victory stated that they were unhappy with Victory's season and the 5–1 defeat by Gamba Osaka in Japan in the opening match of the Asian Champions League. Anthony Di Pietro, chairman of Melbourne Victory, said "Our club sets extremely high standards and we are disappointed with the results of the recent A-League season and also our start to the Champions League campaign" and that "Our intent is to continue to be the benchmark club in the A-League. We wish to be successful in Asia and believe this decision will assist in taking us to that level." Merrick was the last foundation coach to be sacked.

Ernie Merrick was awarded coach of the year in 2007 and again in 2010.

Hong Kong national football team
The Hong Kong Football Association, on 16 December 2011, confirmed the appointment of Ernie Merrick as the new National Head Coach. On 26 October 2012, it was confirmed that Ernie Merrick left his position as the team's Head Coach.

Wellington Phoenix
On 20 May 2013, Merrick was announced as the head coach for Wellington Phoenix on a two-year contract, with an option for a third year. In his second season Merrick coached the team to third equal on the ladder with Adelaide Utd on 46 points and following this success he signed a 3-year contract extension.

On 5 December 2016, Merrick resigned from the Phoenix following a 2–0 loss to Adelaide United.

Newcastle Jets
In May 2017, Merrick was announced as the new coach of Newcastle Jets, following the sacking of Mark Jones after Newcastle Jets finished bottom of the league in the 2016–17 season. Merrick took the Jets to the Grand Final in his first year despite losing the club's top goal scorer Andrew Nabbout in the January transfer window.  The Jets played Melbourne Victory and lost the game after a controversial VAR decision. The following year Sydney FC made an offer to him but he declined and on 17 April 2018, Merrick signed an improved contract keeping him with the Jets until the end of the 2019/20 Hyundai A-League season. Having lost seven starting line-up players through transfers over the twelve-month period since the Grand Final and with long-term injuries to new signing Wes Hoolahan and Captain Nigel Boogaard, the club's results deteriorated and Merrick was sacked by the Jets on 6 January 2020

St Kilda 
In early 2022, Merrick joined AFL club St Kilda as a mentor to senior coach Brett Ratten. The role includes match day duties and weekday roles with the football department.

Personal life 
Merrick was born in Edinburgh to a circus family. Before entering the head coaching ranks, he was a PE teacher as well as a semi-professional football player.

Coaching statistics

Honours

Coach
With Melbourne Victory:
 A-League Championship:  2006–2007, 2008–2009
 A-League Premiership:   2006–2007, 2008–2009
 A-League Pre-Season Challenge Cup:   2008
Personal Honours:
 A-League Coach of the Year: 2006–2007, 2009–10
 Order of Australia: 2014

References

External links
 Melbourne Victory profile
 Oz Football profile

1953 births
Living people
Australian soccer coaches
Australian expatriate soccer coaches
Scottish football managers
Scottish expatriate football managers
Sportspeople from Edinburgh
Scottish expatriates in Australia
Scottish Junior Football Association players
Expatriate soccer managers in Australia
Preston Lions FC managers
Melbourne Victory FC managers
Wellington Phoenix FC managers
Newcastle Jets FC managers
Scottish expatriates in Hong Kong
Australian expatriates in Hong Kong
A-League Men managers
Victorian Institute of Sport alumni
Recipients of the Medal of the Order of Australia
Association football defenders
Scottish emigrants to Australia
Association football players not categorized by nationality